The women's 3 metre springboard, also reported as springboard diving, was one of four diving events on the Diving at the 1956 Summer Olympics programme.

The competition was split into two phases held on different days:

Preliminary round (3 December) – Divers performed five voluntary dives of limited degrees of difficulty and one voluntary dive without limits. The twelve divers with the highest scores advanced to the final.
Final (4 December) – Divers performed four voluntary dives without any limits of difficulty. The final score was the aggregate of the preliminary and final rounds' points.

Results

References

Sources
 
 

Women
1956
1956 in women's diving
Div